Agkistracanthus is an extinct genus of Chimaera from the Mesozoic era. It currently contains a single species, A. mitgelensis. It is known from the Rhaetian to Hettangian epochs, spanning the transition from the Triassic to Jurassic period. Fossils from this genus are known from Switzerland, Austria, and Britain. It is known mostly from isolated and fragmentary material, including fin spines as well as palantine, symphyseal, and mandibular structures.

References

Chimaeriformes
Fossils of Austria
Prehistoric cartilaginous fish genera